Changampuzha Park is a station of Kochi Metro. It was inaugurated by the Prime Minister of India Narendra Modi on 17 June and opened for public on 19 June 2017 as a part of the first stretch of the metro system, between Aluva and Palarivattom. The station is located between Edapally and Palarivattom, close to the Changampuzha Park.

List Of Residential Areas
Amrita Nagar.
Ponekkara.
Elamakkara.
SMS VISTA  Apartments by SMS Builders
SMS TEJUS  Apartments by SMS Builders

References

Kochi Metro stations
Railway stations in India opened in 2017